The 1895 Furman Baptists football team represented Furman University as an independent during the 1895 college football season. Led by H. P. Young in his fourth and final season as head coach, Furman compiled a record of 0–2.

Schedule

References

Furman
Furman Paladins football seasons
College football winless seasons
Furman Baptists football